Joyce Kirby  (March 15, 1915 – 1985) was a British actress. On stage from childhood and a dancer in Cochrane shows, she appeared in several British films of the 1930s.

Selected filmography
 The Midshipmaid (1932)
 A Safe Proposition (1932)
 Britannia of Billingsgate (1933)
 It's a Boy (1933)
 The Fire Raisers (1934)
 Are You a Mason? (1934)
 Hail and Farewell (1936)
 Mayfair Melody (1937)
 The Compulsory Wife (1937)
 Ship's Concert (1937)

References

External links
 

1915 births
1985 deaths
British film actresses
People from Twickenham
20th-century British actresses